Graeme Hudson (16 June 1930 – 23 September 1974) was an Australian cricketer. He played ten first-class matches for Tasmania between 1959 and 1962.

See also
 List of Tasmanian representative cricketers

References

External links
 

1930 births
1974 deaths
Australian cricketers
Tasmania cricketers
Cricketers from Tasmania